The Treaty of Bassein was a pact between the English East India Company and Baji Rao II, the Maratha confederacy's Peshwa, it was signed on 31 December 1802 after the Battle of Poona, at the present day Bassein (Vasai). The treaty was a decisive step in the dissolution of the Maratha Empire, which led to the East India Company's annexation of the empire's territories in western India in 1818.

On 13 May 1803, Baji Rao II was restored as Peshwa under the protection of the East India Company and the leading Maratha state had thus become a client of the British. The treaty led to expansion of the Company rule over the Indian subcontinent. However, the treaty was not acceptable to all Marathas chieftains, and resulted in the Second Anglo-Maratha War.

Terms
The terms of the treaty entailed the following:

A British force of around 6,000 troops be permanently stationed with the Peshwa.
Any territorial districts yielding 2.6 million rupees were to be paid to the East India Company.
The Peshwa could not enter into any other treaty without first consulting the Company.
The Peshwa could not declare war without first consulting the Company.
Any territorial claims made by the Peshwa would be subject to the arbitration of the Company (i.e. Nizam and Gaekwar).
The Peshwa must renounce his claim over Surat and Baroda.
The Peshwa must exclude all Europeans from his service.
To conduct his foreign relations in consultation with the British.

See also
Treaty of Poona

References

External links
1802: Treaty of Bassein
Encyclopædia Britannica – Treaty of Bassein

History of Maharashtra
1802 in India
1802 treaties
History of Vasai
Treaties of the British East India Company
December 1802 events